Lino Muñoz Mandujano (born 8 February 1991) is a Mexican badminton player. He competed at the 2016 Summer Olympics in Rio de Janeiro, Brazil.

Achievements

Pan American Games 
Men's doubles

Pan Am Championships 
Men's doubles

Mixed doubles

Central American and Caribbean Games 
Men's singles

Men's doubles

BWF International Challenge/Series 
Men's singles

Men's doubles

Mixed doubles

  BWF International Challenge tournament
  BWF International Series tournament
  BWF Future Series tournament

References

External links 
 
 

1991 births
Living people
Sportspeople from Mexico City
Mexican male badminton players
Badminton players at the 2016 Summer Olympics
Olympic badminton players of Mexico
Badminton players at the 2011 Pan American Games
Badminton players at the 2015 Pan American Games
Badminton players at the 2019 Pan American Games
Pan American Games bronze medalists for Mexico
Pan American Games medalists in badminton
Central American and Caribbean Games gold medalists for Mexico
Central American and Caribbean Games silver medalists for Mexico
Central American and Caribbean Games bronze medalists for Mexico
Competitors at the 2010 Central American and Caribbean Games
Competitors at the 2014 Central American and Caribbean Games
Competitors at the 2018 Central American and Caribbean Games
Central American and Caribbean Games medalists in badminton
Medalists at the 2015 Pan American Games
Medalists at the 2011 Pan American Games
Badminton players at the 2020 Summer Olympics
21st-century Mexican people